Anthony Birchak (born May 16, 1986) is an American mixed martial artist who competes in the Bantamweight division. A professional competitor since 2009. he formerly competed for the Ultimate Fighting Championship (UFC), Legacy Fighting Alliance, Bellator, Rizin and the MFC.

Background
Birchak is Mexican American  and was born and raised in Tucson, Arizona. Birchak was a highly decorated amateur wrestler at Sahuarita High School. Birchak attended Pima Community College and Grand Canyon University where he majored in Visual Communications. His wife Mercedes White acts as his manager. Together they have launched a mixed martial arts school TOROTech MMA.

Mixed martial arts career

Early career
Birchak made his professional mixed martial arts debut in 2009 competing primarily in regional promotions across the Southwestern United States, before making an appearance at Bellator 41 where he earned a submission victory over Tyler Bialecki. After seven more fights and two titles later on the regional and Canadian circuit, where he compiled a record of 11–1, Birchak signed with the UFC in the summer of 2014.

Ultimate Fighting Championship
Birchak was expected to make his promotional debut against Joe Soto on August 30, 2014, at UFC 177. However, on the day of the weigh-ins, event headliner Renan Barão had to be admitted to the hospital as a result of his attempts to cut weight. Soto was tabbed as his replacement against T.J. Dillashaw.  Subsequently, Birchak was removed from the card entirely.

Birchak faced Ian Entwistle on December 13, 2014, at UFC on Fox 13.  Birchak lost the bout via submission in the first round.

A rescheduled bout with Joe Soto took place on June 6, 2015, at UFC Fight Night 68. Birchak won the fight via knockout in the first round.

Birchak next faced Thomas Almeida on November 7, 2015, at UFC Fight Night 77. He lost the fight via knockout in the first round.

Birchak next faced Dileno Lopes on July 7, 2016, at UFC Fight Night 90. He won the fight via split decision.

Despite winning his last fight, Birchak never received a new contract offer from the UFC and was released from the promotion in February 2017.

Post-UFC career

Rizin FF
Birchak quickly signed with Rizin Fighting Federation after his UFC release. He made his debut against Tatsuya Kawajiri on April 16, 2017, at Rizin FF 5. He lost the bout via unanimous decision.

Birchak next faced Takafumi Otsuka in the first round of the Rizin Bantamweight Grand Prix on July 30, 2017, at Rizin 6. He lost the fight via split decision.

Combate Americas
Birchak faced Adam Martinez at Combate Americas Mexico vs. USA on October 13, 2018. He won the fight via TKO only 51 seconds into the fight.

LFA
Birchak was expected to headline LFA 72 against Nohelin Hernandez on July 26, 2019. However, Hernandez stepped in to replace Sean O'Malley at UFC 239 and was replaced by Raphael Montini de Lima. Birchak won the fight in the first round via submission.

Combate Americas
After the victory in the LFA, Birchak was expected to face Erik Aguilar Radleim at Combate Americas' event on October 11, 2019. However, Radleim pulled out due to visa issues and was replaced by Jose Luis Calvo.

Return to UFC 
Birchak faced Gustavo Lopez, replacing Felipe Colares, on November 7, 2020, at UFC on ESPN: Santos vs. Teixeira. He lost the fight via a submission in round one.

Birchak was scheduled to face Johnny Eduardo on March 20, 2021, at UFC on ESPN 21. However, on March 15 Eduardo withdrew from the bout due to visa issues. It is unclear if a replacement would be sought by the promotion.

Birchak faced off against Tony Gravely, replacing Nate Maness  on April 17, 2021, at UFC on ESPN 22. He lost the fight via TKO in the second round.

After the loss he was released by the UFC.

Championships and accomplishments
 Maximum Fighting Championship
MFC Bantamweight Championship (One time)

Mixed martial arts record

|-
|Loss
|align=center|16–8
|Tony Gravely
|TKO (punch)
|UFC on ESPN: Whittaker vs. Gastelum
|
|align=center|2
|align=center|1:31
|Las Vegas, Nevada, United States
|
|-
|Loss
|align=center|16–7
|Gustavo Lopez
|Submission (rear-naked choke)
|UFC on ESPN: Santos vs. Teixeira
|
|align=center|1
|align=center|2:43
|Las Vegas, Nevada, United States
|
|-
| Win
| align=center| 16–6
| Erik Radleim
| Submission (rear-naked choke)
| Combate Americas: Tucson
| 
| align=center| 1
| align=center| 1:40
| Tucson, Arizona, United States
|
|-
| Win
| align=center| 15–6
| Raphael Montini de Lima
| Submission (rear-naked choke)
| LFA 72
| 
| align=center| 1
| align=center| 1:34
| Phoenix, Arizona, United States
|
|-
| Win
| align=center| 14–6
| Adam Martinez
| TKO (punches)
| Combate 26: Mexico vs. USA
| 
| align=center| 1
| align=center| 0:51
| Tucson, Arizona, United States
|
|-
| Loss
| align=center| 13–6
| Jae Hoon Moon
| Decision (split)
| Rizin World Grand Prix 2017: 2nd Round
| 
| align=center| 3
| align=center| 15:00
| Saitama, Japan
| 
|-
| Loss
| align=center| 13–5
| Takafumi Otsuka
| Decision (split)
| Rizin Bantamweight World Grand Prix 2017: Opening Round - Part 1
| 
| align=center| 2
| align=center| 5:00
| Saitama, Japan
| 
|-
|Loss
|align=center|13–4
|Tatsuya Kawajiri
|Decision (unanimous)
|Rizin 2017 in Yokohama: Sakura
|
|align=center|2
|align=center|15:00
|Yokohama, Japan
|
|-
|Win
|align=center|13–3
|Dileno Lopes
|Decision (split)
|UFC Fight Night: dos Anjos vs. Alvarez
|
|align=center|3
|align=center|5:00
|Las Vegas, Nevada, United States
|  
|-
|Loss
|align=center|12–3
|Thomas Almeida
|KO (punch)
|UFC Fight Night: Belfort vs. Henderson 3
|
|align=center|1
|align=center|4:22
|São Paulo, Brazil
|
|-
| Win
| align=center| 12–2
| Joe Soto
| KO (punches)
| UFC Fight Night: Boetsch vs. Henderson
| 
| align=center| 1
| align=center| 1:37
| New Orleans, Louisiana, United States
| 
|-
| Loss
| align=center| 11–2
| Ian Entwistle
| Submission (heel hook)
| UFC on Fox: dos Santos vs. Miocic
| 
| align=center| 1
| align=center| 1:04
| Phoenix, Arizona, United States
| 
|-
| Win
| align=center| 11–1
| Tito Jones
| Submission (rear-naked choke)
|MFC 38
| 
| align=center| 2
| align=center| 3:30
| Edmonton, Alberta, Canada
| 
|-
| Win
| align=center| 10–1
| Ryan Benoit
| Decision (unanimous)
|MFC 37
| 
| align=center| 3
| align=center| 5:00
| Edmonton, Alberta, Canada
| 
|-
| Win
| align=center| 9–1
| Matt Leyva
| TKO (punches)
| Jackson's MMA Series 10
| 
| align=center| 1
| align=center| 1:22
| Albuquerque, New Mexico, United States
| 
|-
| Win
| align=center| 8–1
| Roman Salazar
| TKO (punches)
| Coalition of Combat: Clash of the Titans
| 
| align=center| 3
| align=center| 1:38
| Phoenix, Arizona, United States
| 
|-
| Win
| align=center| 7–1
| John Green
| TKO (punches)
| Xtreme Combat Promotions: Burlington Beatdown
| 
| align=center| 2
| align=center| 2:14
| Winooski, Vermont, United States
| 
|-
| Loss
| align=center| 6–1
| Jorge Clay
| Submission (rear-naked choke)
| Amazon Forest Combat 1
| 
| align=center| 1
| align=center| 1:29
| Manaus, Brazil
| 
|-
| Win
| align=center| 6–0
| Carlos Ortega
| Decision (unanimous)
| Rage in the Cage 153
| 
| align=center| 3
| align=center| 3:00
| Chandler, Arizona, United States
| 
|-
| Win
| align=center| 5–0
| Tyler Bialecki
| Submission (D'Arce choke) 
| Bellator 41
| 
| align=center| 1
| align=center| 4:06
| Atlantic City, New Jersey, United States
| 
|-
| Win
| align=center| 4–0
| Austin Apollos
| Submission (arm-triangle choke)
| Rage in the Cage 150
| 
| align=center| 1
| align=center| 2:36
| Chandler, Arizona, United States
| 
|-
| Win
| align=center| 3–0
| Matt Betzold
| Submission (triangle choke)
| World Fighting Federation
| 
| align=center| 2
| align=center| 1:12
| Tucson, Arizona, United States
| 
|-
| Win
| align=center| 2–0
| Gio Arvizu
| Submission (armbar)
| World Fighting Federation
| 
| align=center| 1
| align=center| 1:30
| Tucson, Arizona, United States
| 
|-
| Win
| align=center| 1–0
| Michael Poe
| Submission (choke)
| Ringside Ultimo Fighting
| 
| align=center| 1
| align=center| 1:18
| Nogales, Arizona, United States
|

See also
List of male mixed martial artists

References

External links
 UFC Fight Night 68 results: Anthony Birchak gets knockout upset of Joe Soto at MMAjunkie.com}
 
 

1986 births
Living people
American male mixed martial artists
Ultimate Fighting Championship male fighters
American mixed martial artists of Mexican descent
Bantamweight mixed martial artists
Featherweight mixed martial artists
Mixed martial artists utilizing collegiate wrestling
Mixed martial artists utilizing Brazilian jiu-jitsu
Sportspeople from Tucson, Arizona
Mixed martial artists from Arizona
American male sport wrestlers
Amateur wrestlers
American practitioners of Brazilian jiu-jitsu
People awarded a black belt in Brazilian jiu-jitsu